HMS Sir John Moore was one of eight s built for the Royal Navy in 1915 to conduct shore bombardments during the First World War. The ship was assigned to the Dover Patrol for the duration of the war and was sold for scrap in 1921.

Design and description
The Lord Clive design was derived from that of the preceding , modified to suit the smaller and lighter main battery. She displaced  at deep load. To improve stability,  torpedo bulges were incorporated into the hull. Her crew numbered 12 officers and 182 ratings.

Sir John Moore was powered by a pair of three-cylinder triple-expansion steam engines each driving one propeller shaft using steam provided by two coal-burning watertube boilers.

Si were armed with a pair of BL  Mk VIII guns in a single twin-gun turret; Sir John Moores turret was taken from the elderly predreadnought battleship . Their anti-aircraft armament consisted of a Vickers 3-pounder and a 2-pounder guns on high-angle mounts.

Construction and career
Sir John Moore, named for General Sir John Moore, was laid down on 13 January 1915 at Scotts Shipbuilding and Engineering Company's shipyard in Greenock. The ship was launched on 31 May and commissioned on 22 July.

Following the armistice in November 1918, Sir John Moore briefly served as a tender for the gunnery school. She was placed in reserve in early 1920 and listed for sale. Sir John Moore was sold for scrap on 8 November 1921 and towed to Bremen, Germany, on 23 December 1922 for demolition.

Citations

References 

 

 

Lord Clive-class monitors
Ships built on the River Clyde
1915 ships
World War I monitors of the United Kingdom
Royal Navy ship names